Content creation is the act of producing and sharing information or media content for specific audiences, particularly in digital contexts. According to the Merriam-Webster dictionary, content refers to "something that is to be expressed through some medium, as speech, writing or any of various arts" for self-expression, distribution, marketing and/or publication. Content creation encompasses various activities including maintaining and updating web sites, blogging, article writing, photography, videography, online commentary, the maintenance of social media accounts, and editing and distribution of digital media. In a survey conducted by Pew, content creation was defined as "the material people contribute to the online world."

Content creators

News organizations

News organizations, especially those that are the biggest and with a global reach, such as The New York Times, NPR, and CNN, consistently create some of the most shared content on the Web. This is especially true for content-related breaking news and topical events. In the words of a 2011 report from the Oxford School for the Study of Journalism and the Reuters Institute for the Study of Journalism, "Mainstream media is the lifeblood of topical social media conversations in the UK." While the rise of digital media has disrupted traditional news outlets, many have adapted, and have begun to produce content that is designed to function on the web and be shared by social media users. The social media site Twitter is a major distributor of breaking news in traditional formats, and many Twitter users are media professionals. The function and value of Twitter in the distribution of news is a frequent topic of discussion and research in journalism. User-generated content, social media blogging and citizen journalism have changed the nature of news content in recent years. The company Narrative Science is now using artificial intelligence to produce news articles and interpret data.

Colleges, universities, and think tanks
Academic institutions, such as colleges and universities, create content in the form of books, journal articles, white papers, and some forms of digital scholarship, such as blogs that are group edited by academics, class wikis, or video lectures that support a massive open online course (MOOC). Through an open data initiative, institutions may even make available on the Web raw data supporting their experiments or conclusions. Academic content may be gathered and made accessible to other academics or the public through publications, databases, libraries, and digital libraries. Academic content may be closed source or open access (OA). Closed-source content is only available to authorized users or subscribers. An important journal or a scholarly database may be a closed source, available only to students and faculty through the institution's library. Open-access articles are open to the public, with the publication and distribution costs shouldered by the institution publishing the content.

Companies
Corporate content includes advertising and public relations content, as well as other types of content produced for profit, including white papers and sponsored research. Advertising can even include auto-generated content, with blocks of content generated by programs or bots for search engine optimization. Companies also create annual reports which are part of their company's workings and a detailed review of their financial year. This gives the stakeholders of the company insight into the company's current and future prospects and direction.

Artists and writers
Cultural works, like music, movies, literature, and art, are also forms of content. Examples include traditionally published books and e-books as well as self-published books, digital art, fanfiction, and fan art. Independent artists, including authors and musicians, have found commercial success by making their work available on the Internet. These changes have revolutionized the publishing and music industries.

Government
Through digitization, sunshine laws, open records laws and data collection, governments may make whole classes of statistical, legal or regulatory information available on the Internet. National libraries and state archives turn historical documents, public records, and unique relics into online databases and exhibits. This has raised significant privacy issues. In 2012, The Journal News, a New York state paper, sparked outcry when it published an interactive map of gun owners' locations using legally obtained public records. Governments also create online or digital propaganda or misinformation to support law enforcement or national security goals. This can go as far as astroturfing, or using media to create a false impression of mainstream belief or opinion.

Governments can also use open content, such as public records and open data, in service of public health, educational and scientific goals, such as crowdsourcing solutions to complex policy problems, or processing scientific data. In 2013, National Aeronautics and Space Administration (NASA) joined asteroid mining company Planetary Resources to crowdsource the hunt for near-Earth objects, asteroids that could threaten the Earth. Describing NASA's crowdsourcing work in an interview, technology transfer executive David Locke spoke of the "untapped cognitive surplus that exists in the world" which could be used to help develop NASA technology. This is just one way crowdsourcing could be used to enhance public participation in government. In addition to making governments more participatory, open records and open data have the potential to make governments more transparent and less corrupt.

Users
The introduction of Web 2.0 made it possible for content consumers to be more involved in the generation and sharing of content. With the advent of digital media and its ease of access from homes, the amount of user generated content, as well as the age and class range of users, has increased. 8% of Internet users are very active in content creation and consumption. Worldwide, about one in four Internet users are significant content creators, and users in emerging markets lead the world in engagement. Research has also found that young adults of a higher socioeconomic background tend to create more content than those from lower socioeconomic backgrounds. 69% of American and European internet users are "spectators," who consume—but don't create—online and digital media. The ratio of content creators to the amount of content they generate is sometimes referred to as the 1% rule, a rule of thumb that suggests that only 1% of a forum's users create nearly all of its content. Motivations for creating new content may include the desire to gain new knowledge, the possibility of publicity, or simple altruism. Users may also create new content in order to help bring about social reforms. However, researchers caution that in order to be effective, context must be considered, a diverse array of people must be included, and all users must participate throughout the process.

According to a 2011 study, minorities create content in order to connect with niche communities online. African-American users have been found to create content as a means of self-expression that was not previously available. Media portrayals of minorities are sometimes inaccurate and stereotypical which affects the general perception of these minorities. African-Americans respond to their portrayals digitally through the use of social media such as Twitter and Tumblr. More importantly, the creation of Black Twitter has allowed a community to share their problems and ideas.

Teens 
Younger users now have greater access to content, content creating applications, and the ability to publish to different types of media, such as Facebook, DeviantArt, or Tumblr. As of 2005, around 21 million teens used the internet. Among these, 57%, or 12 million teens, are Content Creators. This creation and sharing was happening at a far higher level than among adults. With the advent of the Internet, teens have had far more access to tools for sharing and creating content. Technology is also becoming cheaper and more accessible as well, making content creation far easier for everyone, including teens. Some teens use this to seek fame as social influences through online platforms like YouTube, while others use it to connect to friends through social networking sites. Either way, this demographic is becoming more than just observers; they are creators as well.

Issues

Quality
The rise of anonymous and user-generated content presents both opportunities and challenges to Web users. Blogging, self-publishing and other forms of content creation give more people access to larger audiences. However, this can also perpetuate rumors and lead to misinformation. It can make it more difficult to find quality content that meets users' information needs.

Metadata
Digital content is difficult to organize and categorize. Websites, forums, and publishers all have different standards for metadata, or information about the content, such as its author and date of creation. The perpetuation of different standards of metadata can create problems of access and discoverability.

Intellectual property

The ownership, origin, and right to share digital content can be difficult to establish. On one hand, user-generated content presents challenges to traditional content creators with regard to the expansion of unlicensed and unauthorized derivative works, piracy and plagiarism. On the other hand, the enforcement of copyright laws, such as the Digital Millennium Copyright Act in the U.S., also make it less likely that works will fall into the public domain.

Social movements

The Egyptian revolution of 2011 

Content creation serves as a useful form of protest on social media platforms. The Egyptian revolution of 2011 was only one example of content creation being used to network protestors from all different parts of the world for the common cause of protesting the "authoritarian regimes in the Middle East and North Africa throughout 2011". The protests took place in multiple cities in Egypt such as Cairo and what started out as peaceful quickly escalated into conflict. Social media outlets allowed protestors to network with each other across multiple regions to raise awareness of the widespread corruption in Egypt's government and unite in rebellion. Youth activists promoting the rebellion were able to formulate a Facebook group, "Progressive Youth of Tunisia".

Other 

Examples of more recent social media protesting through online content include the global widespread use of the hashtags #MeToo and #BlackLivesMatter to raise awareness and exact change for women and the black community.

See also 
 Content marketing
 Copyright
 Creative commons
 Creativity
 Creator economy
 Cultural technology
 Gary Vaynerchuk

References

Digital media
Advertising
 
Social media